Otávio Caldeira Afonso Neto (born May 2, 1983 in Macapá), known by his nickname Pretão, is a Brazilian footballer who plays for Santos–AP as midfielder. He already played for national competitions such as Copa do Brasil and Campeonato Brasileiro Série D.

Career statistics

References

External links

1983 births
Living people
Brazilian footballers
People from Macapá
Association football midfielders
Santos Futebol Clube (AP) players
Sportspeople from Amapá